Scott Lake is an unincorporated community in Washington State, located beside Scott Lake. Its location is Section 33, Township 17N, Range 2W, Willamette Meridian and Section 4, Township 16N, Range 2W, Willamette Meridian. The Scott Lake Community had 581 houses as of March 9, 2009, which would likely place the population around 1,505 people based on the average number of people per household in the United States. There are 38 streets in the Scott Lake Community. The Scott Lake Community forms two voter precincts, Scott Lake North and Scott Lake South.

The Scott Lake Community Center is a building owned by the Scott Lake Maintenance Company, a non-profit community owned organization. The Scott Lake Community Center is where decisions are made for the community by the Scott Lake Board of Trustees. The community center is used to hold an annual community garage sale. The community center is also rented out for private events as well.

Scott Lake Grocery is a store located at the entrance of the Scott Lake Community. It is a gas station and grocery store. It has been in existence since 1962.

Scott Lake Golf Course is a nine-hole golf course located next to the lake. As of 2009, it was owned and operated by Joel Boede. The Scott Lake Golf Course has been in existence since 1964.

History 
Scott Lake was originally called Scott's Lake. It was likely named after Joseph M. Scott who homesteaded a property in 1869. The corner of the property came close the lake.

The official name today is Scott Lake, and has been so since at least 1947. However, the name Scotts Lake without the apostrophe is still officially listed as a variant name.

In September 1961, a trust agreement between E. Clifford, J. Clifford, Richard A. Clifford, Edward A. Clifford, B. Clifford, Josephine Clifford, Charles B. Jennings, P. Jennings, J. Swanson, V. Swanson, Paul O. O’ Reilly, and June O’ Reilly was made to form the Scott Lake Development Company. The Scott Lake Development Company bought the farm next to Scott Lake to turn it into a housing development. The land was surveyed and platted by Hugh G. Goldsmith. The first building in the Scott Lake Community was a real-estate office, built in 1961. On February 21, 1962, all roads in the Scott Lake Community were dedicated to the public. On March 29, 1962, the Scott Lake Development Company filed with the state as a corporation. During the early years of this development, the Scott Lake Community was accessible from Interstate 5. McCorckle Rd. (now called 113th Ave.) used to be a crossroad that intersected the freeway.

The Scott Lake Store was built in 1962. The store has been called Scott Lake Grocery since before 1984, and has sold gas for many years. As of 2009, Scott Lake Grocery was on its eighth owner.

The Scott Lake Park, a private park by the lake opened to community residents was built in 1963.

The Scott Lake Country Club (now called the Scott Lake Golf Course) officially opened on April 30, 1965, and the official opening lasted until May 9. It started out as a nine-hole golf course. In the 1970s, it was expanded to an 18-hole golf course. Half of the golf course could only be used during the summer dry months. The ground was too wet and muddy to use that half during the rest of the year. The cost to maintain it was too expensive, and the golf course was reduced back to a nine-hole golf course.

The Scott Lake Maintenance Company, a non-profit community-owned organization, formed on July 5, 1973. The water system was turned over to the board of directors that day; it was the formation of Scott Lake Water. The Scott Lake Community Center was built in 1973.

In 1975, Thurston County changed the names of 27 roads in the Scott Lake Community during a county-wide change.

On August 4, 1991, a 1947 single-engine RC-3 Republic CB airplane crashed into the waters of Scott Lake.

On June 29, 2003, a large fire broke out on the side of Champion Hill. Seven fire departments worked over three hours putting out the fire.

References 

Unincorporated communities in Washington (state)